Crunch Time is an Australian play by David Williamson. It had its world premiere in 2020. Williamson says it is about a family at crisis point, "a story of sibling rivalry and a story about dying." 

It will be Williamson's final play before he retires. He says he was motivated to write it because of the failure of most Australian states to support voluntary euthanasia laws, saying "The NSW Liberal party seems to be still in thrall of the religious right, and it’s the lizard brain dictating the rational capacity of human beings; it’s some emotional fear that someone is going to turn the switch off on them, or God wants to prolong our pain as long as possible before we have a decent death.”.

Plot
Steve has recently retired and passed the family business over to his son Jimmy. Steve hasn't seen his eldest son Jimmy in eight years. When Steve suddenly falls ill, time is running out to repair their broken relationship.

References

External links
Review of 2020 Sydney production at State of the Art
Crunch Time at Ausstage

Plays by David Williamson
2020 plays